Respect Yourself is the eighteenth studio album by Joe Cocker, released in 2002.

Track listing
"You Can't Have My Heart" (John Shanks, Tonio K, C. J. Vanston) – 4:01
"Love Not War" (Barbara Griffin, Tom Snow) – 4:00
"You Took It So Hard" (Shanks, Tonio K, Vanston) – 4:27
"Never Tear Us Apart" (Andrew Farriss, Michael Hutchence) – 4:03
"This Is Your Life" (Shelly Peiken, Shanks) – 4:34
"Respect Yourself" (Luther Ingram, Mark Rice) – 5:14
"I'm Listening Now" (Shanks, Tonio K) – 5:01
"Leave a Light On" (Peiken, Shanks, Vanston) – 4:34
"It's Only Love" (Peiken, Shanks) – 3:55
"Every Time It Rains" (Randy Newman) – 3:34
"Midnight Without You" (Chris Botti, Paul Buchanan, Paul Joseph Moore) – 5:08

Personnel 
 Joe Cocker – vocals
 Jamie Muhoberac – acoustic piano (1, 3-8, 10, 11), keyboards (2), Wurlitzer electric piano (6, 7), synthesizers (6, 11), Hammond B3 organ (8, 9)
 C. J. Vanston – Hammond B3 organ (1, 5), horn arrangements (1, 5, 11), acoustic piano (3)
 Patrick Warren – keyboards (1, 10, 11), acoustic piano (2, 9), Chamberlin (3, 4, 8), synth strings (4, 5), Hammond B3 organ (6, 7), Wurlitzer electric piano (8), synthesizers (8), string arrangements (10, 11)
 John Shanks – guitar, backing vocals (4, 5, 9)
 Tim Pierce – guitar (1, 7, 9)
 Rusty Anderson – guitar (10)
 Paul Bushnell – bass
 Kenny Aronoff – drums
 Lenny Castro – percussion (2-6, 8, 11)
 Bruce Eskovitz – saxophone (1, 5, 6, 11)
 Nick Lane – trombone (1, 5, 6, 11)
 Bill Churchville – trumpet (1, 5, 6, 11)
 Chris Tedesco – trumpet (1, 5, 6, 11), trumpet solo (11)
 Julia Waters – backing vocals (1, 3)
 Maxine Waters – backing vocals (1, 3)
 Fred White – backing vocals (1, 3)
 C.C. White – backing vocals (2, 6, 8, 11)
 Lucy Woodward – backing vocals (5, 9)

Production 
 John Shanks – producer 
 Marc DeSisto – engineer (1, 2, 4, 5, 6, 8, 11), mixing
 Trina Shoemaker – engineer (1, 3, 7, 9, 10)
 Mark Valentine – second engineer 
 Bret Patrick – third engineer
 Bryan Cook – mix assistant
 Daniel Chase – digital editing
 Robert Hadley – mastering
 Doug Sax – mastering
 Jeri Heiden – art direction, design
 John Heiden – art direction, design
 James Minchin – photography

Studios
 Recorded and Mixed at Henson Recording Studios (Los Angeles, California).
 Mastered at The Mastering Lab (Hollywood, California).

Charts

Weekly charts

Year-end charts

Certifications

References

2002 albums
Joe Cocker albums
EMI Records albums
Albums produced by John Shanks